Léon Gastinel (15 August 1823 – 18 October 1906) was a French composer.

Career
He attended the Paris Conservatoire where he studied with Fromental Halévy and was awarded the Grand Prix de Rome in 1846 for his cantata Valasquez. While relatively unknown today, Gastinel wrote two complete masses, two symphonies and four oratorios, and chamber music including at least two string sextets. He was most prolific, however, in his works for the stage, which include the ballet Le Rêve (1890, chor. Joseph Hansen, Paris Opera) and the operas Le Miroir (1853), L'Opéra aux fenêtres (1857) and Titus et Bérénice (1860).

External links

References

1823 births
1906 deaths
19th-century classical composers
19th-century French male musicians
Chevaliers of the Légion d'honneur
French ballet composers
French male classical composers
French opera composers
French Romantic composers
Male opera composers
People from Côte-d'Or
Prix de Rome for composition
Pupils of Fromental Halévy
20th-century French male musicians